Columbus Day is a national holiday in many countries of the Americas and elsewhere, and a federal holiday in the United States, which officially celebrates the anniversary of Christopher Columbus's arrival in the Americas, at Guanahaní, an island in the Bahamas, on October 12, 1492.

Christopher Columbus was a Genovese-born explorer who became a subject of the Hispanic Monarchy to lead a Spanish enterprise to cross the Atlantic Ocean in search of an alternative route to the Far East, only to land in the New World. Columbus's first voyage to the New World on the Spanish ships Santa María, Niña, and La Pinta took about three months. Columbus and his crew's arrival in the New World initiated the colonisation of the Americas by Spain, followed in the ensuing centuries by other European powers, as well as the transfer of plants, animals, culture, human populations, and technology between the New and Old Worlds, an event referred to by some late 20th‐century historians as the Columbian exchange.

The landing is celebrated as Columbus Day in the United States, but the name varies internationally. The Dominican Republic celebrates this day as "The Discovery of America". In some Latin American countries, October 12 is known as Día de la Raza or "Day of the Race". This is the case for Mexico, which inspired José Vasconcelos' book celebrating the Day of the Iberoamerican race. Some countries such as Spain refer to the holiday as the Day of Hispanicity or Día de la Hispanidad and is also Spain's National Day or Fiesta Nacional de España, where it coincides with the religious festivity of La Virgen del Pilar. Since 2009, Peru has celebrated Día de los pueblos originarios y el diálogo intercultural ("Indigenous Peoples and Intercultural Dialogue Day"). Belize and Uruguay celebrate it as Pan American Day and Día de las Américas ("Day of the Americas"). Giornata Nazionale di Cristoforo Colombo or Festa Nazionale di Cristoforo Colombo is the formal name of the celebration in Italy as well as in Little Italys around the world.

United States observance

History 

The first Columbus Day celebration took place on October 12, 1792, when the Columbian Order of New York, better known as Tammany Hall, held an event to commemorate the 300th anniversary of the historic landing.

Many Italian Americans observe Columbus Day as a celebration of their heritage and not of Columbus himself, and the day was celebrated in New York City on October 12, 1866. The day was first enshrined as a legal holiday in the United States through the lobbying of Angelo Noce, a first-generation American, in Denver. The first statewide holiday was proclaimed by Colorado governor Jesse F. McDonald in 1905, and it was made a statutory holiday in 1907.

For the 400th anniversary of Christopher Columbus's voyage in 1892, following a lynching in New Orleans, where a mob had murdered 11 Italian immigrants, President Benjamin Harrison declared Columbus Day as a one-time national celebration. The proclamation was part of a wider effort after the lynching incident to placate Italian Americans and ease diplomatic tensions with Italy. During the anniversary in 1892, teachers, preachers, poets, and politicians used rituals to teach ideals of patriotism. These rituals took themes such as citizenship boundaries, the importance of loyalty to the nation, and the celebration of social progress, included among them was the Pledge of Allegiance by Francis Bellamy.

In 1934, as a result of lobbying by the Knights of Columbus and New York City Italian leader Generoso Pope, Congress passed a statute stating: "The President is requested to issue each year a proclamation (1) designating October 12 as Columbus Day; (2) calling on United States government officials to display the flag of the United States on all government buildings on Columbus Day; and (3) inviting the people of the United States to observe Columbus Day, in schools and churches, or other suitable places, with appropriate ceremonies that express the public sentiment befitting the anniversary of the discovery of America." President Franklin Delano Roosevelt responded by making such a proclamation. This proclamation did not lead to the modern federal holiday; it was similar to language regarding Thomas Jefferson's birthday and Gold Star Mothers Day. In 1941, Italian and Italian Americans were interned and lost rights as "enemy aliens" due to a belief they would be loyal to Italy and not America in World War II; in 1942, Franklin Roosevelt had the removal of the designation of Italian Americans as "enemy aliens" announced on Columbus Day along with a plan to offer citizenship to 200,000 elderly Italians living in the United States who had been unable to acquire citizenship due to a literacy requirement, but the implementation of the announcement was not completed until those interned in camps were released after Italy's surrender to the Allies on September 8, 1943.

In 1966, Mariano A. Lucca, from Buffalo, New York, founded the National Columbus Day Committee, which lobbied to make Columbus Day a federal holiday. These efforts were successful and legislation to create Columbus Day as a federal holiday was signed by President Lyndon Johnson on June 28, 1968, to be effective beginning in 1971.

Since 1971, when Columbus Day became an officially recognized Federal holiday in the United States, it has been observed on the second Monday in October, as commemorated by annual Presidential proclamation noting Columbus' achievements. It is generally observed by banks, the bond market, the U.S. Postal Service, other federal agencies, most state government offices, many businesses, and most school districts. Some businesses and some stock exchanges remain open, and some states and municipalities abstain from observing the holiday. The traditional date of the holiday also adjoins the anniversary of the United States Navy (founded October 13, 1775), and thus both occasions are customarily observed by the Navy and the Marine Corps with either a 72- or 96-hour liberty period.

On October 10, 1992, Pope John Paul II visited the Dominican Republic to celebrate the 500th anniversary of the discovery of the Americas and the arrival of Christianity in the "New World". His visit ended with a mass in the nation's cathedral, the first cathedral in the Western Hemisphere.

Local observance of Columbus Day 

Actual observance varies in different parts of the United States, ranging from large-scale parades and events to complete nonobservance. Most states do not celebrate Columbus Day as an official state holiday.  Some mark it as a "Day of Observance" or "Recognition.” Most states that celebrate Columbus Day will close state services, while others operate as normal.

San Francisco claims the nation's oldest continuously existing celebration with the Italian-American community's annual Columbus Day Parade, which was established by Nicola Larco in 1868, while New York City boasts the largest, with over 35,000 marchers and one million viewers around 2010.

As in the mainland United States, Columbus Day is a legal holiday in the U.S. territory of Puerto Rico. In the United States Virgin Islands, the day is celebrated as both Columbus Day and "Puerto Rico Friendship Day."

Virginia also celebrates two legal holidays on the day, Columbus Day and Yorktown Victory Day, which honors the final victory at the Siege of Yorktown in the Revolutionary War.

Nonobservance 
The celebration of Columbus Day in the United States began to decline at the end of the 20th century, although many Americans continue to celebrate it. The states of Hawaii, Alaska, Vermont, South Dakota, New Mexico, Maine, and parts of California including, for example, Los Angeles County do not recognize it and have each replaced it with celebrations of Indigenous Peoples' Day (in Hawaii, "Discoverers' Day", in South Dakota, "Native American Day").  In the states of Oregon and Washington, Columbus Day is not an official holiday.

Iowa and Nevada do not celebrate Columbus Day as an official holiday, but the states' respective governors are "authorized and requested" by statute to proclaim the day each year. Several states have removed the day as a paid holiday for state government workers, while maintaining it either as a day of recognition, or as a legal holiday for other purposes, including California and Texas.

The practice of U.S. cities eschewing Columbus Day to celebrate Indigenous Peoples' Day began in 1992 with Berkeley, California. The list of cities that have followed suit as of 2018 includes Austin, Boise, Cincinnati, Denver; Los Angeles, Mankato, Philadelphia, Portland, San Francisco, Santa Fe, Seattle, Saint Paul, Phoenix, Tacoma, and "dozens of others".

Columbus, Ohio, has chosen to honor veterans instead of Christopher Columbus, and removed Columbus Day as a city holiday. Various tribal governments in Oklahoma designate the day as Native American Day, or name it after their own tribe.

In 2017, the city council of Akron, Ohio, became split along racial lines with the decision to replace Columbus Day with Indigenous Peoples' Day, creating pushback from the city's Italian-American community. In 2018, a compromise was reached, with the city council voting to name the first Monday of October as North American First People's Day while keeping Columbus Day, and in 2020, Columbus Day was renamed Italian-American Heritage and Culture Day.

Latin American observance

Día de la Raza 

The date Columbus arrived in the Americas is celebrated in some countries of Latin America. The most common name for the celebration in Spanish (including some Latin American communities in the United States) is the Día de la Raza ("day of the race" or the "day of the [Hispanic] people"), commemorating the first encounters of Europeans and the Native Americans. The day was first celebrated in Argentina in 1917, in Venezuela and Colombia in 1921, in Chile in 1922, and in Mexico, it was first celebrated in 1928. The day was also celebrated under this title in Spain until 1957, when it was changed to the Día de la Hispanidad ("Hispanicity Day"), and in Venezuela, it was celebrated under this title until 2002, when it was changed to the Día de la Resistencia Indígena (Day of Indigenous Resistance). Originally conceived of as a celebration of Hispanic influence in the Americas, as evidenced by the complementary celebrations in Spain and Latin America, Día de la Raza has come to be seen by nationalist activists throughout Latin America as a counter to Columbus Day – a celebration of the native races and cultures and their resistance to the arrival of Europeans in the Americas.

In the United States, Día de la Raza has served as a time of mobilization for panethnic Latino activists, particularly since the 1960s. Since then, La Raza has served as a periodic rallying cry for Hispanic activists. The first Hispanic March on Washington occurred on Columbus Day in 1996. The name was used by the largest Hispanic social justice organization in the nation, UnidosUS, which was known as the National Council of La Raza from 1968 to 2017.

Argentina 

The Day of the Race was established in Argentina in 1916 by a decree of President Hipólito Yrigoyen. The name was changed to "Day of Respect of Cultural Diversity" by a presidential decree in 2010 issued by President Cristina Kirchner. The statue of Columbus was removed from its original position near the Casa Rosada and replaced by one of Juana Azurduy, a patriot and leader in the struggle for independence who had indigenous ancestors.

Colombia 
Colombia, whose name originated from Columbus himself, celebrates El día de la Raza y de la Hispanidad (meaning "Day of the Race and Hispanicity"), and is taken as an opportunity to celebrate the encounter of "the two worlds" and to reflect on the richness that the racial diversity has brought to the culture.

Peru 
In Peru, it was known as Día del descubrimiento de América ("Day of the discovery of America"). Since 2009, it has been celebrated as Día de los pueblos originarios y el diálogo intercultural (Indigenous Peoples and Intercultural Dialogue Day).

Venezuela 
Between 1921 and 2002, Venezuela celebrated Día de la Raza along with many other Latin American nations. The original holiday was officially established in 1921 under President Juan Vicente Gómez. In 2002, under President Hugo Chávez, the holiday was changed to Día de la Resistencia Indígena (Day of Indigenous Resistance) to commemorate the Indigenous peoples' resistance to European settlement.

On October 12, 2004, a crowd of progovernment activists toppled a statue of Christopher Columbus by Rafael de la Cova in Caracas. The activists also sprayed allusive graffiti over its pedestal. The walk where the statue had stood was renamed in 2008 "Indigenous Resistance Walk". Later, a statue of an indigenous leader, Guaicaipuro, was erected on the plinth.

Costa Rica 
On September 21, 1994, Costa Rica changed the official holiday from Día de la Raza to Día del Encuentro de las Culturas (Day of the Encounter of Cultures) to recognize the mix of European, Native American (autochthonous populations), African and Asian cultures that constitute modern Costa Rican (and Latin American) culture and ethnicity. In accordance to the Costa Rican labor law, the holiday is observed on October 12. However, should this date coincide with a Tuesday, Wednesday, Thursday, or Friday, the employer shall agree that said holiday be postponed to the following Monday. In 2020, Costa Ricans eliminated this holiday, and in exchange they now celebrate the Military Abolition Day on December 1.

El Salvador 
In June 1915, the Official government newspaper of El Salvador published the legislative decree that states that every October 12 is a national holiday "as a reminder of gratitude and admiration for the discoverer of the New World, Christopher Columbus."  On October 12, 2021, the congress of El Salvador abolished the "Fiesta de la Raza", considering that it harms the dignity of the original peoples.

Caribbean observance 
Only a handful of Caribbean countries observe holidays related to Columbus Day. In Belize, October 12 is celebrated as Day of the Americas or Pan American Day. In the Bahamas, it was formerly known as Discovery Day, until 2001 when it was replaced by National Heroes Day. In 1937, Cuban President Federico Laredo Brú (1936–1940) spoke to the nation and countries of America in Cuba on October 12 commemorating Christopher Columbus's voyage to the New World. Federico Laredo Brú spoke about Columbus's impact on the land and the future of its settlement. He ended his speech with venerating Christopher Columbus's efforts to colonize and establish settlements along the new front and the pride of one's nation. He added "Por mi raza hablo mi espiritu," which translates to "For my race my spirit called," to support the political infrastructure at the time.

Columbus's legacy in the Caribbean 

In December 1937, Cuban president Federico Laredo Brú and Dominican Republic president Rafael Trujillo ordered a crew of aviators to travel through Latin America collecting funds from large capital cities for a monumental light house in the Dominican Republic. The exploration Escuadrilla Binacional Pro Faro de Colón was inspired by Columbus's journey across the North Atlantic Ocean to America. The expedition consisted of three  Stinson Reliant SR-9s  borrowed from the Cuban Air Force – named Santa María, Niña and La Pinta after the vessels commanded by Columbus – and a Curtiss Wright CW-19R from the Dominican military aviation named Colon after Columbus. On December 15, after visiting a majority of South America, their flight to the Peruvian capital Lima was hampered by an unexpected sandstorm. Two planes (Colon and La Pinta) were forced to land in Pisco and Niña disappeared in the storm. The Santa Maria was the only plane to reach Lima as planned, landing at Las Palmas on the day of the storm. After extensive searches, Niña radioed their whereabouts after their radio was damaged in the storm. The aircraft restrategized in Las Palmas, and on December 29 their expedition took off from El Techo airport in Bogotá en route to El Guabito airport in Cali. Later that day, the crew flew into an unexpected storm over the Valley of Cauca. With minimal visibility and poor navigation, Niña, La Pinta, and Santa Maria crashed into high mountains, while Colon, unaware of the other aircraft, flew over the storm and safely made it to Panama City. The plane is preserved today as remembrance of the bravery of the crew and Christopher Columbus's journey.

In 1992, in remembrance of the 500th anniversary of the discovery of America, the Columbus Lighthouse, in Santo Domingo Este was inaugurated. The monument is both a mausoleum and a museum showcasing objects including a boat from Cuba and Colombian jewelry. Its architecture is cross-shaped and represents the Christianization of the Americas. According to the Dominican authorities, remains of Christopher Columbus are sheltered at the lighthouse. However, Spanish authorities have proved through DNA tests that the remains in the Cathedral of Seville are the real remains of Columbus. The Dominican authorities haven't allowed the same DNA tests to be done to the remains in the lighthouse, so it is impossible to know if the remains of Columbus are divided or if the remains in the lighthouse belonged to another person.

European observance

Italy 

Since the 18th century, many Italian communities in the Americas have observed the Discovery of the New World as a celebration of their heritage, despite Italy not existing when Columbus was born, and despite his public renunciation of his Genovese nationality to swear allegiance to the King of Spain

In Italy, Columbus Day has been officially celebrated since 2004. It is officially named Giornata nazionale di Cristoforo Colombo.

The "Lega Navale Italiana" has created a Regata di Colombo as a celebration of the Columbus achievement. Italians have celebrated their "Cristoforo Colombo" naming after him many civilian and military ships, like the ocean liner SS Cristoforo Colombo.

Spain 

The first celebration of the Discovery of the Américas by Columbus in Spain was as early as 1642 when the city of Zaragoza designated the Virgen del Pilar (Our Lady of the Pillar) as symbol of the Hispanidad (Hispanicity) on the date of the Spanish expedition's arrival to the New World. This holiday was declared a religious feast day throughout the Spanish Empire in 1730.
In 1892, the 12 of October was declared a one-time national day in commemoration of the 4th centenary of the Discovery of America and the perpetuation of the festivity was then first considered. The Spanish government suggested other nations (Hispanic American countries, Italy and the United States of America) to join the celebration, which was followed with enthusiasm by them, with a few exceptions.
The Discovery of America and the Hispanicity has been celebrated as a national day since 1918 under different names like "Día de la Hispanidad" or "Dia de la Raza", due to changes of political regimes in the 20th century. The national day emphasises Spain's ties with the Hispanidad, the international Hispanic community and Spanish legacy to the world. In 1981 a royal decree established the Fiesta Nacional y Día de la Hispanidad as a national holiday. However, in 1987 the name was changed again to Fiesta Nacional and October 12 became one of two national celebrations, along with Constitution Day on December 6 as part of a compromise between conservatives, who wanted to emphasize the status of the monarchy and Spain's history, and Republicans, who wanted to commemorate Spain's burgeoning democracy with an official holiday. Since 2000, October 12 has also been Spain's Day of the Armed Forces, celebrated each year with a military parade in Madrid. The holiday is widely celebrated in Spain with official and cultural events throughout the country. Shops and businesses are closed as with other bank holidays. The observation is enhanced with the feast day of Our Lady of the Pillar (Fiestas del Pilar), the so-called Mother of Hispanicity, and of Our Lady of Guadalupe in Extremadura (Santa María de Guadalupe) (appointed Queen of Hispanicity in 1928 by the Vatican) from Guadalupe, Caceres, whose Monastery was the venue in June 1492 for the decisive meeting between the Catholic Monarchs and Columbus to start organizing the travel and where the latter came back in 1493, right after returning from his first voyage, to thank Her for his success.

Opposition to Columbus celebrations 

For years after the first Columbus Day celebration in 1892, opposition to Columbus Day recognized the suffering inflicted on American Indians with westward expansion.

It also originated from anti-immigrant nativists who sought to eliminate its celebration because of its association with immigrants from the Catholic countries of Ireland and Italy, and the American Catholic fraternal organization, the Knights of Columbus. Some anti-Catholics, notably including the Ku Klux Klan and the Women of the Ku Klux Klan, opposed celebrations of Columbus or monuments about him because they thought that it increased Catholic influence in the United States, which was largely a Protestant country.

More recently, mainly since the 1990s, more people oppose Columbus's and other Europeans' actions against the indigenous populations of the Americas. This opposition was initially led by Native Americans and was expanded upon by left-wing political parties.

In the summer of 1990, 350 representatives from American Indian groups from all over the hemisphere, met in Quito, Ecuador, at the first Intercontinental Gathering of Indigenous People in the Americas, to mobilize against the 500th anniversary (quin-centennial) celebration of Columbus Day planned for 1992. The following summer, in Davis, California, more than a hundred Native Americans gathered for a follow-up meeting to the Quito conference. They declared October 12, 1992, to be "International Day of Solidarity with Indigenous People."

Two surveys, conducted in 2013 and 2015 by Rasmussen Reports, found 26% to 38% of American adults are not in favor of celebrating Columbus Day.  A similar survey by Catholic Marist Polls showed 26% opposition /

There are many interrelated strands of criticism. One refers primarily to the treatment of the indigenous populations during the European colonization of the Americas, which followed Columbus's discovery. Some groups, such as the American Indian Movement, have argued that the ongoing actions and injustices against Native Americans are masked by Columbus myths and celebrations. American anthropologist Jack Weatherford says that on Columbus Day, Americans celebrate the greatest waves of genocide of the American Indians known in history.

A second strain of criticism of Columbus Day focuses on the character of Columbus himself. In time for the 2004 observation of the day, the final volume of a compendium of Columbus-era documents was published by the University of California, Los Angeles' Medieval and Renaissance Center. It stated that Columbus, while a brilliant mariner, exploited and enslaved the indigenous population.

Spelman College historian Howard Zinn described some of the details in his book, A People's History of the United States, of how Columbus personally ordered the enslavement and mutilation of the native Arawak people in a bid to repay his investors.

Journalist and media critic Norman Solomon reflects, in Columbus Day: A Clash of Myth and History, that many people choose to hold on to the myths instead of reality in the events surrounding Columbus. He disputes the idea that the Spaniards' arrival was beneficial towards the Indians by quoting History of the Indies by the Catholic priest Bartolomé de las Casas, who observed the region where Columbus was governor. Las Casas writes that the Spaniards were driven by "insatiable greed" as they killed and tortured native populations with "the strangest and most varied new methods of cruelty" and laments that "my eyes have seen these acts so foreign to human nature, and now I tremble as I write."

See also 

Age of Discovery
Spanish Empire
Indigenous Peoples' Day
 L'Anse aux Meadows
 Leif Erikson Day
 List of monuments and memorials to Christopher Columbus
 Thanksgiving (Canada)
 UN Spanish Language Day
 World's Columbian Exposition

Notes

References

External links 

 Berkeley's Indigenous Peoples Day – History of the annual celebration, pow wow and Native American market
 Today in History: October 12 – An article about Columbus Day at the Library of Congress
 Transform Columbus Day Alliance – Denver-based organization with background on opposition to Columbus Day

Christopher Columbus
Federal holidays in the United States
Hispanidad
Holidays and observances by scheduling (nth weekday of the month)
International observances
Italian-American culture
Latin American culture
Monday observances
October observances
Public holidays in the United States
United States flag flying days
Fall events in the United States
Native American-related controversies